Canara Engineering College (CEC) is a private engineering college in Karnataka, India, approximately  from Mangalore in the surroundings of Benjanapadavu. It was established in 2001 as a Millennium project by Canara High School Association. The college is affiliated to Visvesvaraya Technological University, Belgaum . It is also recognized by government of Karnataka and is approved by AICTE, New Delhi. Approximately 400 engineers graduate annually.

About The College 
The college spreads over 26 acres in Benjanapadavu and is accessible from Mangalore or Bantwal. The college is equipped with Cafeteria, Wi-Fi campus, Mess and Hostel facility along with College bus facility for Day Scholars.

CEC is run by Canara High School Association (CHSA), an association based  in Mangalore contributing towards Konkani linguistic minority education. The group was founded by the late Sri. Ammembal Subba Rao Pai (also founder of Canara Bank) in 1891. Ammembal Subbarao Pai was a social reformer and a philanthropist who aimed at imparting modern education blended with ancient cultural values to the youth of Dakshina Kannada. With this in mind he started the Canara High School Association with its primary project being the Canara High School which was established in 1891 and functions even today. The group which is now primarily funded by alumni, also runs several other educational institutions in and around Mangalore.

Courses 
Following are the courses in the college:
 B.E in Electronics and Communication Engineering
 B.E in Mechanical Engineering
 B.E in Computer Science and Engineering
 B.E in Information Science and Engineering
 M.Tech. in Computer Science and Engineering

Professional Society Chapters 
The following Professional Society Chapters function in the college:
 ISTE Student Chapter
 SAE Student Chapter
 IEEE Student Chapter
CSI Student Chapter
 Renewable Energy Club

Technical & Cultural Events 
Canara Engineering College hosts several events with the association of various technical chapters in the college. "Aakriti" is the annual national level Technical & Cultural event of the college. Several other events like INNOVATE, TECHNOPHILIA, TECHGURU, EMERGIA, CIPIX maintains associations of various technical chapters in the college.

Aakriti20 will be celebrated from 27 February to 29 February.

Currently the principal of the college is Dr Ganesh V Bhat.

College has had a successful quiz club over the years winning a good number of competitions. Most Notably, Winning the first place in General Quiz  in VTU's annual youth fest for the year 2018 a reputed competition where hundreds of colleges affiliated to the university had taken part

References

External links 
 Official Website

Engineering colleges in Mangalore
Engineering colleges in Karnataka
Affiliates of Visvesvaraya Technological University
Universities and colleges in Dakshina Kannada district
Educational institutions established in 2001
2001 establishments in Karnataka